Broad Front (which is the translation from Spanish of both Frente Grande and Frente Amplio) may refer to:
Broad Front (Argentina), Argentine political party
Broad Front UNEN, Defunct Argentine political coalition 
Broad Front (Chile), Chilean coalition of parties
Broad Front (Costa Rica), Costa Rican political party
Broad Front (Dominican Republic), Dominican Republic political party
Broad Front (Paraguay), Paraguayan political party
Broad Front (Peru), Peruvian political party
Broad Front (Uruguay), Uruguayan coalition of parties
Broad Front for Democracy, Panamanian political party
Socialist Party – Broad Front of Ecuador, Ecuadorian political party
 Broad front versus narrow front controversy in World War II